Bancroftiana may refer to:
 Bancroftiana, a newsletter of the Bancroft Library of the University of California, Berkeley
 Bancroftiana, a synonym for Euoplos, a spider genus found in Australia